Thomas Whitworth (1844–1912) was an Irish Liberal Party politician.

Whitworth was elected as the Member of Parliament (MP) for Drogheda at a by-election in 1869—caused by the election of Benjamin Whitworth being declared void after an "organised system of intimidation and force" against the electorate—and held the seat until 1874 when he did not seek re-election.

References

External links
 

UK MPs 1868–1874
1844 births
1912 deaths
Irish Liberal Party MPs
Members of the Parliament of the United Kingdom for County Louth constituencies (1801–1922)